Kai Wagner (born 15 February 1997) is a German professional footballer who plays as a left-back for Major League Soccer club Philadelphia Union.

Club career

SSV Ulm 1846
Ahead of the 2015–16 season, Wagner signed his first professional contract at 18 years old with SSV Ulm 1846 competing in the Oberliga Baden-Württemberg, the fifth tier of German football. Wagner made 32 appearances and scored one goal, helping earn SSV Ulm the championship title and promotion to the fourth tier Regionalliga.

Schalke 04
In summer of 2016, Wagner secured a transfer to FC Schalke 04 II competing in the Regionalliga West, the fourth tier of German football.

Würzburger Kickers

In June 2017, Wagner secured a transfer to Würzburger Kickers competing in the 3. Liga, the third tier of German football after being relegated at the conclusion of the 2016–17 season.

Philadelphia Union
In February 2019, Wagner signed with Philadelphia Union in Major League Soccer for an undisclosed transfer fee. Wagner would emerge as one of the best left backs in MLS, contributing 30 appearances and 8 assists in his first season with the Union.

The 2020 season improved on the 2019 season, despite the disruptions of the COVID-19 pandemic, Kai contributed to the Union's advancing to the semi-finals of the  MLS is Back Tournament including his first goal for the Union in a 2–1 win over Inter Miami CF. The Union finished the season with the best league record earning the team's first trophy, the 2020 Supporters' Shield. Wagner contributed 14 starts, one goal, and two assists in the Union's championship season.

In January 2021, Wagner signed a new contract with the Union through the 2022 season, with an option for 2023. In August 2021, Wagner was selected to the 2021 MLS All-Star Game versus the Liga MX All-Star team.

Career statistics

Club

Honours
SSV Ulm 1846
Oberliga Baden-Württemberg: 2015–16

Philadelphia Union
Supporters' Shield: 2020

Individual
MLS All-Star: 2021, 2022
MLS Best XI: 2022

References

External links
 

1997 births
Living people
People from Göppingen (district)
Sportspeople from Stuttgart (region)
German footballers
Association football defenders
SSV Ulm 1846 players
FC Schalke 04 II players
Würzburger Kickers players
Philadelphia Union players
Regionalliga players
3. Liga players
Footballers from Baden-Württemberg
Major League Soccer players